Kingham railway station in Oxfordshire, England, is between the Oxfordshire village of Kingham and the Gloucestershire village of Bledington, to which it is closer. It is also the closest station to the town of Chipping Norton.

The station is on the Cotswold Line and is served by Great Western Railway trains.

History
The OW&W amalgamated with other railways on 1 July 1860 to form the West Midland Railway; this in turn amalgamated with the Great Western Railway on 1 August 1863. In the meantime, a second branch line from Chipping Norton Junction, the Bourton-on-the-Water railway, had opened on 1 March 1862; that railway was absorbed by the GWR on 1 February 1874.

The reversal was inconvenient for trains which did not need to call at Chipping Norton Junction, so for their benefit the GWR built a bridge to carry through trains between Banbury and Cheltenham over the Oxford and Worcester line; it opened to goods trains on 8 January 1906 and to passenger trains on 1 May 1906. The station was renamed Kingham on 1 May 1909.

Upon the opening of this new link, a new express train service began to use the line, including the new flyover, once a day in each direction.

In 1953, rationalisation was carried out which resulted in the closure of the East and West signal boxes and the singling of the line between them for working purposes. The remaining track between the boxes formed the base of a self-contained triangle for turning engines. By this time, the line to King's Sutton was only open for freight and a token passenger service operated to Chipping Norton.

British Railways withdrew passenger services from Kingham to Cheltenham and Chipping Norton in 1962, and freight services in 1964. British Rail designated the Oxford and Worcester line "The Cotswold Line". Passenger traffic increased in the 1990s and 2000s.

In 2015, a car park extension was added with 100 car spaces. A new footbridge was also added, with provision for passenger lifts.

Locomotive depot
A small depot was constructed in 1881 for the Cheltenham extension; this was in the Chipping Norton branch fork, and had a  turntable, which was too small for a tender locomotive to be turned. This was replaced by a  turntable early in the twentieth century, large enough for a "Dean Goods" 0-6-0 tender locomotive; however, the depot closed in 1906. It was rebuilt, reopening again in 1913, as a sub-shed of Worcester, but the turntable was later removed, and the depot finally closed in December 1962.

Appearances in television and film 
Kingham station was used as the setting for an episode (S3 E5) of BBC comedy This Country. The episode was first broadcast on 16 March 2020.

Accidents and incidents
On 15 July 1966, an express passenger train was derailed due to an unsecured switch blade on a set of points. Eighteen people were injured.

Services
Great Western Railway operate all services at Kingham. The typical off-peak service at the station in trains per hour is:
 1 tph to London Paddington

Bus services
Two bus routes serve the station. Pulham & Sons runs route 802 to Bourton-on-the-Water via Stow-on-the-Wold on behalf of Gloucestershire County Council and route X8 to Chipping Norton via Churchill on behalf of Oxfordshire County Council. Route 802 runs Monday to Saturday. Route X8 runs Monday to Friday only, peak hours only.

Notes

References

External links

Railway stations in Oxfordshire
DfT Category E stations
Former Great Western Railway stations
Railway stations in Great Britain opened in 1855
Railway stations served by Great Western Railway